Emmanuel Clottey (born 17 April 1974) is a Ghanaian former professional boxer who competed from 1995 to 2016. As an amateur, he competed at the 1994 Commonwealth Games.

He's the brother of fringe contender Judas Clottey and former world champion Joshua Clottey.

Professional career
Born in Bukom, Ghana, in August 2007, Emmanuel lost to title contender Victor Ortíz at the Grand Plaza Hotel in Houston, Texas.

In his next fight Clottey was knocked out by Mike Alvarado.

Clottey lost a bid for the WBO Africa welterweight title, losing to Bethuel Ushona.

See also
Notable boxing families

References

External links

1974 births
Living people
Ghanaian male boxers
Boxers from Accra
Boxers at the 1994 Commonwealth Games
Lightweight boxers
Light-welterweight boxers
Welterweight boxers
Commonwealth Games competitors for Ghana